Irreligion in Wales or non-religion in Wales refers to non-religious identity in Wales. In the 21st century, following rapid social secularisation in Welsh society, "no religion" became the dominant religious identity in Wales.

History and demography

Middle Ages 
Welsh historian has suggested that the lives of monks and cleric in the second half of the middle ages were "essentially secular".

19th century 
It has been suggested that in the 19th century, many people in Wales had pride in being one of the more Christian countries in the British Isles but following the Welsh Intermediate Education Act 1889, secular education given in Wales led to a big blow to Welsh nonconformist Christianity. This has been described as revolutionary legislation where education was offered for all children, regardless of socioeconomic status or ability.

Male voice choirs also emerged in the 19th century, formed as the tenor and bass sections of chapel choirs, and embraced the popular secular hymns of the day.

20th century 
John Davies has suggested that there is a lack of written record about irreligion in Wales, stating,"The irreligious are a lost element in Welsh historiography; as they have left virtually no written record. The historians of the twentieth century have tended to ignore them." Davies added that the Welsh had become one of the most secular nations in Europe by the opening of the twentieth century with little enthusiasm for discussions on religious matters.

According to Paul Chambers, Welsh medium chapel and denominations provided sanctuary and the cultural protection of the Welsh language, later leading to the formation of Plaid Cymru.  The state then took over this cultural defence role with the Welsh Language Act 1967 and later legislation. This secularisation is related to structural differentiation and state power, and this particular process seems very specific to Wales.

21st century 
In response to the 2011 census results in Wales, English evolutionary biologist Richard Dawkins suggested that Wales was ahead of the other countries of the UK in moving towards non-religious views.

In 2020, Wales Humanists praised the unique and mostly exemplary political culture of modern Wales, which included a devolved administration which was established as a secular institution. Their report also praises the introduction of opt-out organ donation and suggests that Wales has a legacy of independent thought and equality. Suggestions made by the report include ending religious discrimination by faith schools and through collective worship, introducing non-religious pastoral care in hospitals, and legal recognition of non-religious marriages.

In a new age 3-16 curriculum rolled out in 2022, the Welsh Government changed the traditional Religious Education (RE) subject to "Religion Values and Ethics" which "must also reflect that fact that a number of non-religious philosophical convictions are also held in Wales".

In November 2022, the 2021 census results were published showing that being non-religious was the largest single statistical group in Wales. Wales Humanists coordinator Kathy Riddick responded to this news by noting that Wales is now officially the least religious country in the UK and that this was not a new development. She also suggested that politicians in Wales are "overdue to properly address" this fact in law and public policy. She added, "Thankfully in navigating these changes, Wales has a strong tradition of supporting freedom of religion or belief to draw on, from disestablishment over 100 years ago to the creation of the most inclusive curriculum in the UK just last year".

Demographics 
The number of non-religious people in Wales was 18.5% according to the 2001 census, which rose to 32.1% in 2011.

A 2018 poll, found that 58% of Welsh people were non-religious, making Wales the most non-religious country in the UK.

The annual population of Wales data of 2019 showed that under 50% of people in Wales considered themselves to be Christians, with almost as many being non-religious.

The 2021 census recorded 46.5 per cent had “No religion” which is a larger statistical group than any single religion and up from 32.1 per cent in 2011.

The Office for National Statistics (ONS), which is responsible for publishing Census data stated that answering the religion question on the census was voluntary. They added that more people in Wales chose to answer the question in 2021 compared to 2011. The ONS suggested that the ageing population, fertility, mortality, and migration could be contributing factors to the rise in non-religion.

Regional 
The following is a table of non-religious people in Wales by local authority area as found in the 2021 census results in Wales.

Ethnicity 

The following is a table of the Irreligious populations among Ethnic groups and Nationalities in Wales.

See also 

 Irreligion in the United Kingdom
 Religion in Wales

References 

Religion in Wales
Religious demographics